Lake Eerie is a 2016 horror film, directed by Chris Majors, starring Lance Henriksen, Betsy Baker, Marilyn Ghigliotti, Tavares Jamal Cherry, Anne Leigh Cooper, Meredith Majors and Al Snow.

The movie had its world premiere at the HorrorHound Film Festival in September 2015 and was officially released on January 15, 2016 through Gravitas Ventures.

Plot 
A young widow moves into an old house on Lake Erie to recover from the sudden loss of her husband; however, she soon discovers a dark secret and that she is not alone.

Cast
 Lance Henriksen as Pop 
 Betsy Baker as Eliza
 Marilyn Ghigliotti as Realtor
 Al Snow as Man in Black
 Meredith Majors as Kate Ryan
 Tavares Jamal Cherry as Guardian
 Anne Leigh Cooper as Autumn
 Ben Furney as Jack Ryan

Reception 
Horrornews.net reviewed Lake Eerie, stating that "There’s the potential for a good movie that sometimes managed to shine through. For the most part, it was an entirely forgettable experience that wasted a good idea." DVD Talk panned the movie and stated that it was "insultingly poor and a complete waste of time".

References

External links 
 
 

2016 horror films
American horror films
2010s English-language films
English-language horror films